Tsuburo Dam is a concrete gravity dam located in Nara prefecture in Japan. The dam is used for agriculture and water supply. The catchment area of the dam is 38.8 km2. The dam impounds about 150  ha of land when full and can store 25650 thousand cubic meters of water. The construction of the dam was started on 1952 and completed in 1962.

References

Dams in Nara Prefecture
1962 establishments in Japan